Brain Structure and Function is a bimonthly peer-reviewed scientific journal covering research on brain structure-function relationships. It was established in 1891 as Anatomische Hefte, renamed first Zeitschrift für Anatomie und Entwicklungsgeschichte in 1921 and then Anatomy and Embryology in 1974, before obtaining its current name in 2007. It is published by Springer Science+Business Media and the editors-in-chief are Michel Thiebaut de Schotten and Susan R. Sesack.

Abstracting and indexing 
The journal is abstracted and indexed in:

According to the Journal Citation Reports, the journal has a 2020 impact factor of 3.270.

References

External links

Neuroscience journals
Springer Science+Business Media academic journals
English-language journals
Bimonthly journals
Publications established in 1891